Fred Thomas Wigington (December 16, 1897 – May 8, 1980) was a Major League Baseball pitcher who played in  with the St. Louis Cardinals.

Wigington was a very successful amateur and minor league pitcher before his brief Major League career. In 1922, he led the Nebraska State League with 261 strikeouts. He had a reputation for having an effective curveball but less remarkable fastball.

References

External links

1897 births
1980 deaths
Major League Baseball pitchers
Baseball players from Nebraska
People from Colfax County, Nebraska
St. Louis Cardinals players
Fort Smith Twins players
Hastings Cubs players
New Haven Profs players
Omaha Buffaloes players